The York Buildings Waterworks' Water Tower was a water tower on the north bank of the River Thames and a dominant feature of the 18th century London skyline.

It was erected in the late 17th century on a site at the end of Villiers Street, by the York Watergate, now part of the Victoria Embankment Gardens. The Survey of London includes a drawing (plate 31 in volume 18) showing the building.

The prominent position and height of the water tower meant it appeared in many paintings and drawings of London's north bank at the time. These include:

References

Towers in London
Former buildings and structures in the City of Westminster
Former towers
Wooden towers
Water towers in the United Kingdom